Gateway High School (GHS) serves the residents of Monroeville and Pitcairn, Pennsylvania. It is part of the Gateway School District and serves grades 9 through 12.

History
Gateway High School was built in 1958 and dedicated on November 15, 1959.

Athletics
Gateway High School is a member of the Pennsylvania Interscholastic Athletic Association (PIAA) and the Western Pennsylvania Interscholastic Athletic League (WPIAL), District 7. The mascot of the school district is the Gateway Gator, a stylized alligator.

Notable alumni
 Curtis Bray (Class of 1987) - College football coach
 Bob Buczkowski (Class of 1982) - NFL player
 Darienne Driver (Class of 1996) - School superintendent
 Paul Graham (Class of 1982) - Computer scientist, entrepreneur, author, and investor
 Kathy Keller (Class of 1968) - Author and church founder
 Don Roy King (Class of 1965) - Television director
 Marilyn Suzanne Miller (Class of 1967) - Television writer and producer
 Montae Nicholson (Class of 2014) - NFL player
 Jaquan Brisker - NFL Player

References

External links
Gateway High School website

Public high schools in Pennsylvania
Schools in Allegheny County, Pennsylvania
Education in Pittsburgh area